Gustave Jean-Jacques Saintenoy (born in Brussels, 6 February 1832, died in Schaerbeek, 17 January 1892) was a Belgian architect.

Family 
He married into the Cluysenaar family of Architects. In 1861 he married Adèle-Clothilde Cluysenaar (born 31 August 1834, died 15 August 1901). They had one son born in 1862 named Paul, who also became a famous architect.

After his death he was buried in Schaerbeek Cemetery.

Architect 
He was a student at the Académie Royale des Beaux-Arts in Brussels. In 1866 he became the titular architect of the Count of Flanders. He built important buildings in royal command such as the Palace of the Count of Flanders and the Royal castle of Amerois.

Work
 Brussels-Luxembourg railway station
 Palace of the Count of Flanders, Brussels
 Royal City Theater, Bruges.
 Chateau des Amerois

References

19th-century Belgian architects
Klausener Family
1832 births
1892 deaths
Architects from Brussels
Burials at Schaerbeek Cemetery